Hoyerhagen is a municipality in the district of Nienburg, in Lower Saxony, Germany.

References

Nienburg (district)